Aleksandar Adrianov Vitanov (born 3 April 1990) is a Bulgarian footballer who plays as a goalkeeper.

Vitanov signed for Lokomotiv from Spartak Plovdiv in February 2014.

References

External links

Living people
1990 births
Bulgarian footballers
First Professional Football League (Bulgaria) players
FC Spartak Plovdiv players
PFC Lokomotiv Plovdiv players
FC Oborishte players
Association football goalkeepers